Ahn In-sook (or spelled Ahn In-suk; born October 8, 1952) is a South Korean actress. Ahn was born in Seoul and graduated from Chung-Ang University with a major in film and theater. Ahn was a member of KBS children's choir and debuted as a daughter of actor, Kim Jin-kyu in the 1963 film Bubu joyak directed by Choi Hun.

Filmography
*Note; the whole list is referenced.

Awards
 1975 the 11th Baeksang Arts Awards : Best Acting in TV
 1975 the 11th Baeksang Arts Awards : Favorite Film Actress selected by readers

References

External links
 
 

South Korean film actresses
Actresses from Seoul
1952 births
Living people
Chung-Ang University alumni
Best Actress Paeksang Arts Award (television) winners